The Desperate Hours is a 1955 play by Joseph Hayes, based on his 1954 thriller novel of the same title. The story, about three escaped convicts invading a family's home and holding them hostage, was the basis for the films The Desperate Hours in 1955 and Desperate Hours in 1990.

The play opened in New Haven's Shubert Theatre in 1955 before premiering on Broadway later that year.

The Desperate Hours won Tony Awards for Best Play and Best Direction in 1955.

References

External links 
 

1955 plays
Broadway plays
American plays adapted into films
Plays based on novels
Tony Award-winning plays
Hostage taking in fiction